Apatrapya (Sanskrit, also apatrāpya; Pali: ottappa; Tibetan Wylie: khrel yod pa) is a Buddhist term translated as "decorum"  or "shame". It is defined as shunning unwholesome actions so as to not be reproached by others of good character.  It is one of the virtuous mental factors within the Abhidharma teachings. 

The Abhidharma-samuccaya states: 

What is apatrapya? It is to avoid what is objectionable in the eyes of others.

The difference between hri (self-respect) and apatrapya (decorum) is that hri means to refrain from unwholesome actions due to one's own conscience, while apatrapya means to refrain from unwholesome actions to avoid being reproached by others.

Alternate translations
decorum- Guenther, Rangjung Yeshe Wiki
shame - Erik Pema Kunsang
consideration - Rangjung Yeshe Wiki
propriety - Rangjung Yeshe Wiki

See also 
 Mental factors (Buddhism)

Notes

References 
 Guenther, Herbert V. &  Leslie S. Kawamura (1975), Mind in Buddhist Psychology: A Translation of Ye-shes rgyal-mtshan's "The Necklace of Clear Understanding". Dharma Publishing. Kindle Edition.
 Kunsang, Erik Pema (translator) (2004). Gateway to Knowledge, Vol. 1. North Atlantic Books.

External links 
 Ranjung Yeshe wiki entry for khrel_yod_pa

Wholesome factors in Buddhism
Religion and peace
Morality
Sanskrit words and phrases